Neyland is a surname. Notable people with the surname include:

 Martin Neyland (1877–1947), English footballer
 Robert Neyland (1892–1962), American footballer

References